Louis Allan Williams (June 22, 1922 – February 28, 2011) was the Attorney General of British Columbia from 1979 to 1983. He also held the posts of labour minister and minister responsible for native affairs. Williams died on February 28, 2011, following a long illness.

Williams was born in Glenavon, Saskatchewan, and raised in Assiniboia, Saskatchewan. He moved with his parents to Vancouver, British Columbia, in 1936. He served in the Royal Canadian Air Force during World War II. Williams later studied law at the University of British Columbia and was called to the British Columbia bar in 1950. He served six years on the West Vancouver Municipal Parks and Recreation Commission and was elected to the municipal council for West Vancouver in 1965. After leaving provincial politics, he returned to the practice of law. Williams served again on West Vancouver council from 1993 to 2002.

References

1922 births
2011 deaths
Attorneys General of British Columbia
British Columbia municipal councillors
British Columbia Liberal Party MLAs
British Columbia Social Credit Party MLAs
Canadian King's Counsel
Lawyers in British Columbia
Members of the Executive Council of British Columbia
People from Assiniboia, Saskatchewan
Peter A. Allard School of Law alumni
Royal Canadian Air Force personnel of World War II
20th-century Canadian politicians